The pileated flycatcher (Xenotriccus mexicanus) is a species of bird in the family Tyrannidae; it is endemic to western Mexico. It is a small bird with gray feathers, white chest, yellow beak and a pointed gray-feathered tip on the top if its head. The flycatcher's natural habitat is subtropical forest, but during the summer it is found in tropical high-altitude scrubland. Their diet consists mainly of insects. Deforestation has affected the pileated flycatcher's population; it is now thought to be 20,000 to 50,000 birds.

The flycatcher is currently considered of least concern, and does not approach any of the criteria to be considered a "threatened species".

Deforestation has increased every year around the world and is the cause of many species becoming nearly threatened or endangered and also contributes to some becoming extinct, including the pileated flycatcher which was thought to be "near threatened" until 2013.

Clearing of forest trees and surroundings has negatively affected the pileated flycatcher.  With the loss of trees, the flycatcher has lost its place to live and create nests to care for their eggs and young.  Deforestation also contributes to the loss of other species including insects, which is the dominant source of food for the flycatcher.

Survival for this species will become very unlikely if the destruction of their habitat continues.

References

 
 
 
 
 
 

Xenotriccus
Endemic birds of Mexico
Birds of the Sierra Madre del Sur
Birds described in 1938
Taxa named by John T. Zimmer
Taxonomy articles created by Polbot